Zachary Bruenger (born April 11, 1990) is an American professional stock car racing driver. He last competed part-time in the NASCAR Xfinity Series, driving the No. 79 for Means Racing.

Motorsports career results

NASCAR
(key) (Bold – Pole position awarded by qualifying time. Italics – Pole position earned by points standings or practice time. * – Most laps led.)

Xfinity Series

K&N Pro Series East

References

External links
 

1990 births
Living people
Sportspeople from Quincy, Illinois
NASCAR drivers
Racing drivers from Illinois